John Flittie (March 22, 1856 – January 21, 1913) was a U.S. politician who served as North Dakota's first Secretary of State from 1889 to 1892.

Johan Flittie was born in Lesja, in Oppland, Norway. He was the son of Johannes Throndson Flittie and  Anna Johannesdotter Flittie.
His family emigrated to North America in 1867, settling in Watonwan County, Minnesota. He graduated from Mankato Normal School (now Minnesota State University, Mankato) in 1878 and moved to Dakota Territory soon after. He was a member of the Dakota Territorial Council (the upper house of the territorial legislature) in 1885–1886, and won election as a Republican to the newly created office of Secretary of State in 1889. After serving an abbreviated 1-year term, he was re-elected to a full 2-year term in 1890. He did not seek re-election in 1892. He died in Williston, North Dakota.

Notes

1856 births
1913 deaths
Secretaries of State of North Dakota
Minnesota State University, Mankato alumni
People from Lesja
Norwegian emigrants to the United States
People from Watonwan County, Minnesota
Members of the Dakota Territorial Legislature
North Dakota Republicans
People from Williston, North Dakota
19th-century American politicians